Cyborgs: Heroes Never Die (Kiborhy: Heroyi ne vmyrayut) is a 2017 Ukrainian war drama film about the Second Battle of Donetsk Airport during the war in Donbas.

Production and release
Half of the film's US$1.8 million budget was financed by the Ukrainian government, and significant help was provided by the Ukrainian Ministry of Defence and the General Staff of the Ukrainian Armed Forces.

The first official teaser trailer for the movie was released on 15 August 2017.

It was released on 7 December 2017 which was symbolically planned for the third anniversary of the fall of the old Donetsk airport terminal.

Parts of the movie were shot in the closed Chernihiv Shestovytsia Airport.

Plot
The film depicts the wartime lives of five Ukrainian brothers in arms fighting for control of Donetsk International Airport. The five men represent various social strata, professions, and beliefs for which they are willing to kill and prepared to die.

Cast

 Makar Tikhomirov as "Mazhor"
 Andrey Isaenko as "Subota"
 Roman Yasinovskiy as "Gid"
 Oleksandr Piskunov as "Mars"
 Mariia Zanyborshch  as Natalka
 Yuriy Khvostenko as "Borshch"
 Oleh Drach as Chief of the General Staff of the Armed Forces of Ukraine
 Dmytro Saranskov
 Oleksandr Suhak
 Vyacheslav Dovzhenko as "Serpen"
 Viktor Zhdanov as "Staryy"
 Kostyantyn Temlyak as "Psykh"
 Roman Semysal as Kombat "Redut"
 Oleksandr Laptii
 Anastasiya Karpenko as Yulya
 Roman Vyskrebentsev
 Vsevolod Shekita as captured russian
 Ihor Salimonov as separatist leader
 Andrii Sharaskin as "Bohemia", cameo
 Yevhen Nyshchuk as chaplain
 Oleksandr Zahorodnyi as journalist, cameo
 Vladislav Zhurenko as cameraman, cameo

Reactions
Radio Free Europe/Radio Liberty commented on the movie: While clearly meant to drum up support for the war effort, Cyborgs isn't entirely propagandistic, containing more nuanced scenes than one might expect, and Russian is spoken nearly as much as Ukrainian throughout the film.

Box office
The movie secured the top spot at the (Ukrainian) Box Office (earning US$302,000) in its opening week.

Charity 
On the occasion of the film's release, the Cyborgs team and the Come Back Alive Foundation («Повернись живим») organized the #ICare! (#ЯНебайдужий!). As part of the initiative, 5 hryvnias from each ticket purchased for the movie "Cyborgs" will be transferred to help the families of those killed in the battle for Donetsk airport.

References

External links
 

2017 films
2017 war drama films
Ukrainian war drama films
Ukrainian-language films
2010s Russian-language films
Films set in Ukraine
War in Donbas films
Films set in 2014
Films shot in Ukraine
2017 drama films